The Flower Thrower, Flower Bomber, Rage, or Love is in the Air is a 2003 stencil mural in Beit Sahour in the West Bank by the graffiti artist Banksy, depicting a masked man throwing a bunch of flowers. It is considered one of Banksy's most iconic works; the image has been widely replicated.

It was inspired by images of 1960s protests, such as Bruno Barbey photograph of the May 68 protests in France (e.g. his photograph of Boulevard Saint-Germain, 6th arrondissement, Paris, France. May 6, 1968).

An earlier version was originally drawn by Banksy in 1999 and presented at his first exhibition in 2000.

References

2000s murals
2007 paintings
Works by Banksy